Innamaadhoo (Dhivehi: އިއްނަމާދޫ) is one of the inhabited islands of Raa Atoll in the Maldives.

Geography

Climate
Tropical monsoon climate prevails in the area. The rainiest month is November, with an average of  rainfall, and the driest is February, with  rainfall.

Demography
Innamaadhoo counted 333 women and 383 men, as of September 2006.

Economy 
Carpentry is the island's main business. On looking at the whole country, the carpentry experts are mostly from Innamaadhoo. From very small fishing boats to large ships are built on this island. 

Even though wheat was grown a few decades ago, farming is not a very wide field. 

The islanders used to fish a lot in the 1990s. Salting fish was a very wide field. Though, now, as the field perished, fishermen and fish-sellers are much less. The reason is believed to be because carpentry pays well (carpentry is a very good money-maker). 

Inhabitants don't contribute directly to the field of tourism, which may be because there is no resort nearby. Though, a lot of diving boats, rowing boats and ferries, etc. (needed for resorts) are built here.

References

Islands of the Maldives